Hebeloma crustuliniforme, commonly known as poison pie or fairy cakes, is a gilled mushroom of the genus Hebeloma found in Europe and North America, and has been introduced into Australia. Its specific name derives from the Latin crustulum or little biscuit. It is moderately poisonous.

Description
The buff to pale tan cap is 3–10 cm in diameter, convex then umbonate with an inrolled cap margin until old. The gills are pale grey-brown, with orange to brown spores and exude droplets in moist conditions. The stipe is 4–9 cm high and .5–1.5 cm thick, with a wider base. It bears no ring, while the thick flesh is white. The fungus has a radish-like smell and bitter taste.

The spores are brown, elliptical, and somewhat rough.

Similar species 
Similar species include Hebeloma sinapizans and Hebeloma insigne.

Distribution and habitat
A common mushroom, Hebeloma crustuliniforme can be found in open woodland and heathland in summer and autumn, though may also be found in winter in places with milder climates such as California. As of December 2022, hebeloma.org lists collections from 18 countries including most parts of Europe, from both coasts of Northern America and a small number of collections in Victoria, Australia.

Toxicity
This fungus is poisonous, the symptoms being those of a severe gastrointestinal nature, namely vomiting, diarrhea and colicky abdominal pain several hours after consumption.

References

crustuliniforme
Fungi of Europe
Fungi of North America
Poisonous fungi